The Tomark Viper SD4 is a Slovak single–engine, all-metal, two-seat low wing monoplane with a fixed tricycle undercarriage and side-by-side seating for two people. The aircraft is built by Tomark s.r.o. of Prešov.

Design and development
Design work on the Viper began in 2004, with the first flight on 1 November 2006 and market introduction in 2008. It is intended for touring, training and glider towing.

The Viper is constructed mostly of metal, with aluminium skinning, using CNC machining. Composite materials are used for the tips of the flying surfaces, the fuselage upper decking, engine cowling and wheel fairings. The wings have constant chord and curved, slightly upswept tips; they are built around one main and one auxiliary spar. The short span ailerons move on piano-type hinges, with slotted flaps on the rest of the trailing edges. The low-mounted horizontal tail is also of constant chord apart from a cut-out for rudder movement; the starboard elevator carries a flight adjustable trim tab. Fin and rudder are straight-edged, but swept.

The standard Viper is powered by a 60 kW (81 hp) Rotax 912UL flat four engine but the more powerful 75 kW (100 hp) Rotax 912ULS is an option.  The forward fuselage is a monocoque, the rear a tube structure with an aluminium skin. The cockpit seats two in side-by-side configuration under a framed single piece canopy, with further transparencies in the fuselage immediately aft. The main undercarriage legs are cantilever springs. The mainwheels are faired and fitted with hydraulic brakes; the nosewheel is also faired and may, as an option, be steerable.  Other options include instrumentation, ballistic parachute and towing gear.

The aircraft received its EASA SD4 RTC restricted type certificate in March 2016. In the US it is an accepted light-sport aircraft.

Operational history

The first two production aircraft appeared at AERO Friedrichshafen in April 2007. AERO 2009 saw the first example of the Ultralight version and the announcement of the LSA variant It was originally aimed at French flying clubs but is now being marketed in the USA following certification in October 2010. US production at Winnsboro, Texas is under consideration.

By mid-2010 there were two Vipers registered in France and ten in Slovakia. By November 2010, 26 had been built.

Variants
UL
LSA

Specifications (UL version)

See also
Tomark Skyper

References

External links

Single-engined tractor aircraft
Viper
2000s Slovak ultralight aircraft
Low-wing aircraft
Aircraft first flown in 2006